is a Japanese comedian and actor who is part of the comedy duo Drunk Dragon with Muga Tsukaji. He graduated from Kanagawa Prefectural Ayase Nishi High School.

Biography
Suzuki was born in Ayase, Kanagawa, in 1975. According to Shutsubotsu! Adomachikku Tengoku, his family ran a tavern called Kuro Hyōe in Ebina, Kanagawa. Suzuki's cousins are models Aoi Miura and Moe Miura. His grandfather was a member of the House of Representatives.

Suzuki was inspired to become a comedian while browsing through a comedy book in a bookstore. He was admitted to the fifth class of School JCA. Suzuki formed a comedy duo with Muga Tsukaji.

He also engages in independent activities without Tsukaji.

Filmography

TV series
Current appearances

Other appearances

Former appearances

Dramas

Films

Dubbing

Animation
Finding Nemo - Crab

References

External links
 

Japanese comedians
1975 births
Living people
People from Ayase, Kanagawa
Male actors from Kanagawa Prefecture